This list is arranged by the main material of manufacture.

Where a manufacturer has produced different kits in different materials, they are duplicated under each material.

Polystyrene

Injection-moulded (high pressure)
Academy Plastic Model (Korea)
Accurate Miniatures (USA)
Ace (Ukraine)
Ace Corporation (Korea)
Addar (USA)
Admiral (Czech Republic) - brand of AZ Model
AFV Club (Taiwan)
Aim Fan Model (Ukraine)
Airfix (UK)
AK Interactive (Spain)
Alanger (Russia)
Alan Hobby (Russia)
AMT (USA)
Amusing Hobby (Japan)
Aoshima Bunka Kyozai (Japan)
Ark Models (Russia)
Arma Hobby (Poland)
Arii (Japan)
Arsenal Model Group (Ukraine)
Art Model (Ukraine)
Asuka Model (Japan) - former Tasca
Atlantis Models (USA)
Aurora Plastics Corporation (USA)
AvantGarde Model Kits [AMK], (Macau with subsidiary in UK)
AVD Models (Russia)
Avis (Ukraine)
Bandai (Japan)
Beemax Model Kit. (Macau, China)
Belkits (Belgium)
Big Planes Kits (Ukraine)
Bílek (Czech Republic)
Black Label (China) - Brand of Dragon Models
BorderModel (China)
Bronco Models (Hong Kong, China)
Caesar Miniatures (Taiwan)
Cavico (M.I.Molde co.,ltd.) (Japan)
C.C.Lee (China)
Clear Prop! (Ukraine)
Condor (Ukraine)
Cooperativa (Russia)
Copper State Models (Latvia)
Crown (Japan)
Cyber Hobby (China) - Brand of Dragon Models
Czech Model (Czech Republic)
Daco Plast (Russia)
Davric (Tony Brown Models) (UK)
Delta 2 (Italy) - former Delta 
Dora Wings (Ukraine)
Doyusha (Japan)
Dragon Models Limited (Hong Kong, China)
Dream Model (China)
Eaglewall (Dorking Foundry Ltd) (UK)
Eastern Express (Russia)
Ebbro (MMP co.,ltd.) (Japan)
Eduard (Czech Republic)
Emhar (UK)
E-Model (China)
Encore E Models (USA)
ESCI/ESCI-ERTL (Italy/USA) - stopped production due to bankruptcy, moulds bought by Italeri and others
Faller (Germany)
Fine Molds (Japan)
FinMilModels (Finland)
First To Fight (Poland)
Flagman (Russia)
Flametoys (Japan)
FlyHawk Model (China)
Foresight (Japan)
Freedom Model Kits (Taiwan)
Frog (UK) (1955-1976)
Fujimi Mokei (Japan)
Games Workshop (Warhammer 40K etc..) (UK)
Gaspatch Models (Greece)
Gecko Models (Hong Kong, China)
Gallery Models (USA) - brand of Model Rectifier Corporation
Glencoe Models (USA)
Good Smile Company (Japan)
Gowland & Gowland (USA)
Great Wall Hobby (China) - brand of Lion Roar
GSI Creos (Japan) - former Gunze Sangyo
Hasegawa (Japan)
HäT (USA)
Hawk (USA)
Hehexing (China)
Heller SA (France)
HK Models (Hong Kong, China)
HMA Garage (Japan)
Hobby Boss (China)
Hobbycraft (Canada)
Hobby Japan (Japan)
Huma Modell (Germany)
Humbrol (UK) - Airfix/Heller partnership to build models with common sprues paints and glues, brand kept by Airfix for paints and glues
IBG Models (Poland)
ICM Holding (Ukraine)
Ideal Toy Company (USA)
Ilovekit (China)
Imai Kagaku (Japan)
Imex Model (USA)
Imperial Hobby Productions (USA) 
Italeri (Italy)
Jo-Han (USA)
Kaiyodo (Japan)
Kawai (Japan)
Kinetic (Hong Kong, China)
Kiel Kraft (UK)
Kitty Hawk Models (China)
Kleeware (UK/USA)
Kotobukiya (Japan) 
KP Models (Czech Republic)
Life-Like (USA)
Lincoln International (Hong Kong, UK)
Lindberg Models (USA)
Lion Roar (China)
LS (Japan)
Maco (Germany)
Magic Factory (China) - weapon platforms, ships and spaceships. Trade name of YiFang Fun (Shenzhen) Technology Co., Ltd. Started 2021.
Marusan (Japan)
Master Model (VEB PLasticart in new boxings) (East Germany, after 1989 Germany)
Master Box (Ukraine)
Matchbox (UK/Germany) - stopped production due to bankruptcy, moulds bought by Revell Germany and others
Max Factory (Japan)
Meng Model (Hong Kong, China)
Merit (J & L Randall Ltd) (UK)
Merit International (China)
Micro Ace (Japan) - former Arii
MiniArt (Ukraine)
Minicraft (USA)
Miniwing (Czech Republic)
Mirage Hobby (Poland)
Mirror Models (Ireland)
Mitsuwa Model (Japan)
Model Products Corporation (MPC) (USA)
Modelcollect (China)
Modelcraft (Canada)
Modelkasten (Japan) - brand of Artbox
Modelsvit (Ukraine)
Moebius Models (USA)
Monochrome (Japan) - brand of Interallied
Monogram (USA)
Monti System (Ukraine) - brand of Seva
Mr. Hobby (Japan) - brand of GSI Creos
MSD Model (Russia)
Nagano (Japan)
Nichimo (Japan)
Nihon Plastic (Japan)
Nitto Kagaku (Japan)
Novo - old Frog kits made in the Soviet Union (1971-)
Nu-Bee (VEB Plasticart in new boxings) (East Germany)
Nunu (Macau, China)
Occidental Réplicas (Portugal) - Brand of a plastic plant for home products, that started to build models that were used or in use by the Portuguese armed forces current and past, age of discovery ships naus caravelles etc, spitfire Fiat G-91 fighters and T-6 Texan, and so on, sold several sprues molds to Revell and Italeri for several kits.
Otaki (Japan)
Orange Cat Industry (China)
Pacific Coast Models (USA)
Panda Hobby (Hong Kong, China)
Paramount (UK)
Palmer Plastics (USA)
Peco (Pritchard Patent Product Co) (UK)
Pegasus Hobbies (USA)
Pilot-Replicas (Sweden)
Pit-Road (Japan)
Plasticos Lodela S.A. (Mexico)
Plastic Soldier (UK)
Platz (Japan)
Playfix (VEB-Plasticart re-boxings) (East Germany, after 1989 Germany)
Plum (Japan)
PM Model (Turkey)
Preiser (Germany)
Protar (Italy)
PST (Belarus)
Pyro Plastics Corporation (USA)
Ratio (UK)
Renwal (USA)
Revell (USA/Germany)
Riich Models (China)
Roden (Ukraine)
Rosebud Kitmaster (UK)
Rosso (Japan)
Rubicon Models (UK)
R.V.Aircraft (Czech Republic)
Ryefield Model (Hong Kong, China)
Salvinos JR Models (USA)
Sankyo Mokei (Japan)
Sanwa Plastic (Japan)
Scalecraft (Middlesex Toy Industries Ltd) (UK)
Skilcraft (USA)
Skunkmodels (Hong Kong, China)
Směr (Czech Republic)
S-Model (China)
Special Hobby (Czech Republic) - former MPM
Starfix (Israel)
Strombecker (USA)
Sunny International (Japan)
Supermodel (Italy)
Suyata (Hong Kong, China)
Sweet (Japan)
Takom (Hong Kong, China)
Tamiya Corporation (Japan)
Tan Model (Turkey)
Tarangs (Sweden)
Tauro Model (Italy)
Testor Corporation (USA)
Tiger Model (Hong Kong, China)
Thunder Model (China)
Tokyo Marui (Japan)
Tomytec (Japan)
Toxso Model (China)
Tri-ang - marketing name of Lines Bros in France for Frog.
Trimaster (Japan)
Tristar (Hong Kong, China)
Trumpeter (Macaw, China)
Tsukuda Hobby (Japan)
Unimodel (Ukraine)
Union Model (Japan)
Varney (USA)
VEB Plasticart (East Germany)
Very Fire (China)
Vespid Models (China)
Vision Models (Taiwan)
Vulcan (Dorking Foundry Ltd) (UK)
Vulcan Scale Models (Hong Kong, China)
Wako (Japan)
Waltersons (Hong Kong, China)
Wave Corporation (Japan)
Williams Bros. (USA)
Wills Finecast (UK)
Wingsy Kits (Ukraine)
Wingnut Wings (New Zealand)
Xact Scale Models (Hong Kong, China)
Xuntong Model (China)
Yamashita Hobby (Japan)
Zoukei Mura (Japan) - subsidiary of Volks
ZTS Plastyk (Poland)
Zvezda (Russia)

Injection-moulded ("short-run" low pressure)
Amodel (Ukraine)
Armory (Ukraine)
Aviation USK (USA)
AVI Models (Czech Republic)
AZ Model (Czech Republic)
Azur (Czech Republic/France) - Brand of Special Hobby
Brengun (Czech Republic)
Eduard (Czech Republic)
Fonderie Miniatures (France)
F-RSIN (France)
Fly Models (Czech Republic)
Griffon Model (Japan)
High Planes Models (Australia/Singapore) - Australian Company moved to Singapore after sale. Aircraft kits and accessories.
JAYS Model Kits (New Zealand) Aircraft Kits mostly formerly Ventura.
Kiwi Wings (New Zealand)  - Aircraft Kits part of JAYS Model Kits
Kora Models (Czech Republic)
Legato (Czech Republic) - brand of AZ Model
Leoman (USA)
Mach2 (France)
Maquette (Russia)
Mark I. Models (Czech Republic)
Merlin Model (UK)
Military Wheels (Ukraine)
Mikromir (Ukraine)
Modelsvit (Ukraine)
MPM production s.r.o. (Czech Republic)
Olimp Model (Ukraine)
OzMods Scale Models (Australia)
Pavla Models (Czech Republic)
Pegasus (UK)
Roden (Ukraine)
RS Models (Czech Republic)
Skif (Ukraine)
Sova-M (Ukraine)
Special Hobby (Czech Republic)
Sword (Czech Republic)
Tasman Models (New Zealand) - Aircraft Kits part of JAYS Model Kits
Valom (Czech Republic)
Ventura Models (New Zealand) - Taken over by JAYS Model Kits.
12 Squad (USA)

Vacuum formed
Airmodel (Germany)
Contrail (England)
Dinavector (Japan)
Dubena (Czechoslovakia)
General Products (Japan)
Gerald J. Elliott (England)
MiniArt (Ukraine)
Modakit (England)
ModelsPark (Latvia)
OzMods Scale Models (Australia)
PSC (Czechoslovakia)
Rareplanes (UK) (1969-2000) 
Sanger  (UK)

3D-printed
3D Model Parts (USA) 
Black Cat Models (France) 
Classic Airships (USA) 
ION Model (Poland) 
Kokoda Trail Models (Australia) 
Micro Master (New Zealand) 
Model Monkey (USA) 
One Man Model (Japan) 
Quinta Studio (Russia)

Card
FlyModel (Poland)
GPM (Poland)
Halinski (Poland)
JSC (Poland)
ModelArt (Bulgaria)
Modelik (Poland)
Schreiber-Bogen (Germany)
Williamshaven

Mixed materials
ARLO-Micromodel (Portugal, 1939-)
Bluejacket Shipcrafters (USA) 
Combrig Models (Russia) 
Eduard (Czech Republic)    
Flagship Models (USA) 
Fleetscale (UK) 
Frog (1931-1949) - flying and static models. See also Injection-moulded polystyrene (high pressure).
John R. Haynes (UK) 
JetMads - Resin Cast and 3D Printed (Turkey) 
Skybirds - wood and metal
Pontos Model (South Korea) 
Revival Deutschland (Italy/Germany) 
Southern Cross Models (Australia) 
The Scale Shipyard (USA) 
Veteran Models (China) 
Veteran Made Models (Australia)

Photo-etched metal / turned metal
Aber (Poland) 
Aerobase (Japan) 
AKA Model (China)
Eduard (Czech Republic) 
Gold Medal Models (USA) 
L'Arsenal (France) 
Master Model (Poland) 
Toms Modelworks + White Ensign Models (USA)

Resin cast
A&W Models  (Japan)
Accurate Armour  (UK)
Aerobonus (Czech Republic) - brand of Aires
Aires  (Czech Republic)
Airmodel  (Germany)
Akatombo Works  (Japan)
Aki Products (Japan)
Anigrand Craftswork  (Hong Kong, China)
Arlo-Micromodel (Portugal)
Baxmod (mainly South African subjects)
B-Club (Japan) - brand of Bandai
Black Cat Models  (France)
Blue Ridge Models  (USA)
Choroszy Modelbud  (Poland)
Classic Warships  (USA - ceased model production but publishing continues) 
CMK (Czech Master Kit) (Czech Repuclic) - brand of Special Hobby
Combrig Models  (Russia)
Czech Master Resin (CMR)  (Czech Repuclic) - brand of Special Hobby
Duarte Models  (Brazil)
Fantastic Plastic Models  (USA)
Grand System Models  (China) - gundam model kits 
Gumka Miniatures  (Japan)
Kombinat  (Poland)
Modeler's (Japan) - brand of Interallied
Model Factory Hiro  (Japan)
Olimp  (ProResin)
OzMods Scale Models  (Australia)
ParryArt  (Australia)
Quickboost (Czech Republic) - brand of Aires
Planet Models (Czech Republic) - brand of Special Hobby
Reskit  (Ukraine)
Rising Sun Modeling (Japan) - brand of Konishi
Silver Wings  (Poland)
Studio 27  (Japan) - brand by Gilles
Three Inches Under  (USA)
Tori Factory (Korea) - former Zlpla
TRIGLAV MODEL  (Slovenia)
Unicraft Models  (Ukraine)
Unlimited Air Models (Japan)
Ushimodel  (Japan)
Verlinden Productions (Belgium/USA)
Veteran Models (China) 
Wave Corporation (Japan)
Wheelliant (Czech Republic) - brand of Aires

White metal
Southeastern Finecast (Great Britain) from 2000
Wills Finecast (Great Britain) Up to 2000
N & C Keyser (K's Models) (Great Britain)
Stephen Poole kits (Great Britain)
DJH Models (Great Britain)
Nu-Cast (Great Britain)
Branchlines (Great Britain)

Wood
Guillow (USA)
OcCre (Spain)
Kolderstok (The Netherlands)
Scale Decks (USA) 
Scientific (USA)
Sterling Models (USA)
Woody Joe (Japan)

Unknown
Please move these to the relevant section(s) above.
ARV
Flite Test
Gallery
Rebell Hobby (Sweden)

See also
List of model aircraft manufacturers
List of model car brands

Bibliography
Scale Aircraft Modelling, Guideline, January 2013
Plastic Model & Tool Catalog 2015 , Magazine Daichi, April 2015
 Lune, Peter van. "FROG Penguin plastic scale model kits 1936 - 1950". Zwolle, The Netherlands, 2017, published by author

References

scale model kit manufacturers
Scale_model_kit

ja:プラモデル製造メーカー一覧